Niels Hintermann (born 5 May 1995) is a Swiss World Cup alpine ski racer. Born in Bülach, Zürich, Hintermann specializes in the speed events of Downhill and Super-G.

Career
Hintermann made his World Cup debut at age 20 in November 2015 at Lake Louise, and was fortieth in the downhill. He scored his first World Cup points three weeks later at Val Gardena, at 29th place in the downhill. Hintermann won his first World Cup race (and first podium) the following season, in the combined at Wengen in January 2017.

World Cup results

Season standings

Race podiums
 2 wins – (1 DH, 1 AC)
 6 podiums – (5 DH, 1 AC), 19 top tens

World Championship results

Olympic results

References

External links

Swiss Ski team official site 
Niels Hintermann at Atomic Skis
 

1995 births
Living people
Swiss male alpine skiers
People from Bülach
Alpine skiers at the 2022 Winter Olympics
Olympic alpine skiers of Switzerland
Sportspeople from the canton of Zürich
21st-century Swiss people